The FC Basel 1914–15 season was their twenty-second season since the club's foundation on 15 November 1893. The club's chairman was Ernst-Alfred Thalmann, it was his twelfth presidential term all together. FC Basel played their home games in the Landhof in the district Basel-Wettstein in Kleinbasel, Basel.

Overview 
The professional trainer, Englishman Percy Humphreys, was due to continue his job this season, but due to the outbreak of the first World War he had to return home.

The war also caused further impingements to the football season. There were no pre-season matches and championship start was delayed. In their 1914–15 season, Basel played 11 matches. 6 of these were in the domestic league and 5 were friendly matches. Of these friendlies, 3 were won and 2 ended in a defeat. There was one home fixture played in the Landhof and four away games. In these friendly games, Basel scored 12 and conceded 12 goals.

Also due to the war, the Swiss Serie A 1914–15 was played as an interim Championship, there was no relegation and promotion between Serie A and Serie B. The Serie A was divided into four regional groups, an east, a west and two central groups. Basel were allocated to the central group A together with their local rivals Old Boys, Nordstern Basel and the reigning champions Aarau. Basel started into the championship with an away defeat against Aarau. Then they won both home games against the other two local teams. After the new year and the away draw against Nordstern, Basel lost the home game against Aarau and the away game against Old Boys, to finish in third position in the league table. In their six games, Basel scored 15 goals and conceded 14. Aarau continued to the semifinal, but there they were defeated by Brühl St. Gallen. Brühl also won the final 3–0 against Servette to become the new Swiss champions.

Players 
Squad members

Results 

Legend

Friendly matches

Serie A

Central Group A results

Central Group A league table

See also
 History of FC Basel
 List of FC Basel players
 List of FC Basel seasons

References

Sources 
 Rotblau: Jahrbuch Saison 2014/2015. Publisher: FC Basel Marketing AG. 
 Die ersten 125 Jahre. Publisher: Josef Zindel im Friedrich Reinhardt Verlag, Basel. 
 FCB team 1914–15 at fcb-archiv.ch

External links
 FC Basel official site

FC Basel seasons
Basel